U.S. Army Cyber Command (ARCYBER) conducts information dominance and cyberspace operations as the Army service component command of United States Cyber Command.

The command was established on 1 October 2010 and was intended to be the Army's single point of contact for external organizations regarding information operations and cyberspace.

Mission
United States Army Cyber Command directs and conducts integrated electronic warfare, information and cyberspace operations as authorized, or directed, to ensure freedom of action in and through cyberspace and the information environment, and to deny the same to its adversaries.

Organization
Army Cyber is the Army service component command supporting U.S. Cyber Command.

All 41 of the Active Army's cyber mission force teams reached full operational capability (FOC) by September 2017. The cyber mission force teams are composed of a defensive component, denoted cyber protection teams (CPTs), and an offensive component. In addition, 21 CPTs are being readied in the Reserve component. Initial operational capability (IOC) for some of the cyber protection teams was attained as early as 2014 during DoD missions.

Subordinate units, Cyber

  Army Network Enterprise Technology Command
  U.S. Army Intelligence and Security Command will be under the operational control of Army Cyber for cyber-related actions.
  1st Information Operations Command (Land) (1st IO CMD (L))
1st Battalion - Trains and deploys field support, vulnerability assessment, and operational security awareness teams.
2nd Battalion - Conducts Army cyber opposing force operations at military training centers worldwide.
Army Reserve Element
  780th Military Intelligence Brigade
  Army Cyber Protection Brigade, Fort Gordon
  60th Offensive Cyberspace Operations Signal Battalion (OCOSB)

History

The Army achieved an initial cyber operating capability in October 2009 by employing the Army Space and Missile Defense Command/Army Forces Strategic Command (USASMDC/ARSTRAT) supported by NETCOM/9thSC(A), 1st IO CMD (L) and INSCOM. The command was originally announced to be named Army Forces Cyber Command (ARFORCYBER). The command was established on 1 October 2010 with the name Army Cyber Command (Army Cyber), commanded by then-Maj. Gen. Rhett A. Hernandez. There are plans for the command to move to Fort Gordon, in Augusta, Georgia home of the United States Army Cyber Center of Excellence, the U.S. Army Cyber Corps and Signal Corps.

List of commanding generals

See also
 List of cyber warfare forces
PLA Unit 61398
 United States Cyber Command

References

External links
U.S. Army Cyber News
U.S. Army Cyber Command
 Army Cyber Command NCOs take hands-on tour at U.S. Army Women's Museum

2010 establishments in Georgia (U.S. state)
Military units and formations established in 2010
Army
United States Army Service Component Commands